Hagnau am Bodensee is a commune and a village in the district of Bodensee in Baden-Württemberg in Germany. It lies on the north shore of Lake Constance (Bodensee in German).

Literature
 (en) Tourist Information Hagnau (Editor): Hagnau Lake Constance. For the best times of the year. (leaflet about 2008).

References

External links

 Official Homepage of Hagnau, Lake Constance
 HDR Photos of Hagnau am Bodensee, October 2013

Bodenseekreis
Populated places on Lake Constance